Oligia obtusa is a species of cutworm or dart moth in the family Noctuidae.

The MONA or Hodges number for Oligia obtusa is 9418.

References

Further reading

 
 
 

Oligia
Articles created by Qbugbot
Moths described in 1902